Ghanchakkar is a 2013 Indian heist black comedy-drama film directed by Rajkumar Gupta and produced by Ronnie Screwvala and Siddharth Roy Kapur from UTV Motion Pictures. The film stars Emraan Hashmi and Vidya Balan in the lead roles. The theatrical trailer debuted on 28 June 2013. The film received mixed reviews from critics.

Plot
'Sanju' (Emraan Hashmi) is an expert-  master safe cracker who maintains a casual lifestyle with his wife Neetu (Vidya Balan).

He meets two criminals, Pandit and Idris and they offer him a chance to assist a bank robbery. If the heist is successful, they will ensure that he never has to worry about money again, so he accepts the offer.

The three thieves make off with 30 crore inr.

After the bank robbery, Pandit  decides that Sanju should keep the suitcase of money hidden (as Pandit and Idris already have record with the police, coupled with the fact that Sanju is married, and will be the least suspected by the police ) and that they will meet after three months and then they will split the money.

After three months, Pandit and Idris discover that Sanjay lost his memory in an accident with head injury and hence, Sanju is suffering with retrograde amnesia.

Pandit and Idris decide that they can not trust Sanju anymore, they need to keep a close eye on him in case he runs away. They stay at Sanjay and Neetu's house until Sanjay remembers where he hid the money and to make sure they're not cheated. They give him a week to do so.

Sanjay tries to remember where he hid the money but he can not.

When Sanjay learns that his college friend Uttam Nagpal (Parvin Dabas) has become an overnight millionaire, apparently by winning a lottery, he suspects Uttam.

Then, he suspects his wife Neetu of knowing the hiding place of the money because she has joint account with him and also sole-access to their bank-locker. He accuses her of conspiring with his friend.

Later, Sanju finds out that Uttam moves to London after being confronted about the money and also Sanjay finds out that Neetu has purchased a one-way ticket for London so he goes to buy a gun to kill his wife Neetu in anger.

While he is doing this, an unknown person contacts Sanjay and urges him to divulge the location of the money.

Under pressure and now frustrated, Pandit and Idris kidnap Neetu and ask Sanjay to meet them in a train station by writing a note and attaching it on the screen of his TV, on the third platform at 1:30am.

When both Pandit and Idris confront Sanjay and demand the money, Sanjay claims that he doesn't even recognize the two.

When Sanjay tells them that Neetu knew where the money was, Idris begins to lose control. When he pulls the trigger on his pistol, he is shot dead by the unknown person and thereafter, he kills Pandit in a rage in the train.

The unknown person tells Sanjay that the bank robbery plan idea was his which he shared with Idris and Pandit but never got his share ...and after persistently questioning and trying to blackmail Sanjay, the unknown person shoots frantically in frustration and Neetu is injured—hoping that the traumatic vision of his wife's suffering will make Sanjay reveal the truth.

However, this fails since Sanjay has in fact lost all his memory by now stressed by trauma.

The original mastermind of the bank heist searches Sanjay's pockets, only to find a banana. In retaliation, he shoots Sanjay in the shoulder and then Sanjay's phone rings.

It is revealed that the caller is Sanju's mother who calls his son like every other day out of her motherly affection and concern however during the conversation she sub-consciously reveals that the suitcase has been kept at her home while remaining implicitly oblivious as to what is in the suitcase and further questions Sanju whether he will be coming to take the suitcase or not. She further expresses her desire to sell the brief case off if in case Sanju does not turn up to take away his belonging. Meanwhile, the heist's mastermind overhears this and jumps on the train out of excitement but he slips on Sanjay's banana skin and impales his neck on Sanjay's fork. Disillusioned, confused and tired, Sanjay throws his phone out of the train while Neetu smiles. Sanjay has no idea what's going on, but the train goes on its way with the dead bodies of the mastermind, Pandit and Idris.

Cast
 Emraan Hashmi as Sanjay 'Sanju' Athray
 Vidya Balan as Neetu Athray
 Rajesh Sharma as Pandit
 Namit Das as Idris
 Parvin Dabas as Uttam Nagpal
Subhrajyoti Barat as the unknown person who kills Idris and Pandit in the train

Soundtrack

The soundtrack of Ghanchakkar was composed by Amit Trivedi. The lyrics were written by Amitabh Bhattacharya.

Track listing

Promotion
Emraan Hashmi and Vidya Balan worked hard to bring the film to a wider audience. The on-screen couple appeared on various television shows, including Dance India Dance, Chidiyaghar, India's Dancing Superstar and Comedy Nights with Kapil.

Critical response
Wassupbollywood.com rated the movie 2/5, saying, "Ghanchakkar is a terribly executed film. Watch it to feel better in your college lecture or job this Monday."

Raja Sen of Rediff.com said that the film "stops being funny somewhere through the second half". The critic continued: "Vidya Balan, in particular, deserves to be singled out for applause simply because of her willingness as a leading lady to take on a role this farcical. One time watch only for Vidya Balan." He gave the film only 2 out of a possible 5 stars.

However, Pakistani critic Mohammad Kamran Jawaid from the Dawn newspaper gave Ghanchakkar a positive review, stating that Vidya Balan "gets the short end of the stick" and is "a few hundred miles away from any original appeal". He notes that the film's "big reveal" is hardly a revelation. And as frightening as the hoodlums want themselves to appear, their sense of menace never surfaces the way it ought to. Also, their good-cop, bad-cop attitude gets old fast, and we never get to know much about them. However, these minor grumbles are just that – minor grumbles".

A reviewer for The Times of India gave the movie, a rating of 3.5 out of 5 and wrote "Of the talent-Emraan gets his bewildered expression correct. And for fear of losing it, he keeps it going for the most part. Vidya provides a few laughs trying to ape the Punjabi stereotype. However, her act doesn't qualify for the real thing."

Sudhish Kamath of The Hindu stated "Ghanchakkar almost succeeds too. But sadly, though it is fun as you watch it unfold, it is also mostly forgettable, offering us very few moments to hold on to."

Box office
The film had an average opening, achieving an occupancy rate of 40–50% at morning and afternoon screenings. At evening and late-night screenings, it reached a higher occupancy rate of 55–60%. On release, the first day's box office earnings were Rs 72 million, grossing Rs 75.5 million on the second day. Ghanchakkars opening weekend generated 227.5 million, beating Ek Thi Daayan'''s weekend sales of 180 million at the domestic box office. The film made around Rs 30 million on its first Monday, making an overall Rs 260 million in 4 days. On Tuesday it collected another Rs 22.5 million, making a total of Rs 280 million. It grossed Rs 380 million in its first week.

References

External links
 

2013 films
2010s Hindi-language films
2013 black comedy films
2010s crime comedy-drama films
2010s heist films
Indian black comedy films
Indian crime comedy-drama films
Indian heist films
UTV Motion Pictures films
Films scored by Amit Trivedi
Films directed by Raj Kumar Gupta